Dóra Medgyessy (born July 21, 1986) is a Hungarian basketball player for Aluinvent DVTK and the Hungarian national team.

She participated at the EuroBasket Women 2017.

References

1986 births
Living people
Hungarian women's basketball players
Sportspeople from Debrecen
Point guards